Gracious David-West (born ) is a Nigerian convicted serial killer. From July until September 2019, David-West killed at least 15 women, mostly in the city of Port Harcourt. He was apprehended on 19 September 2019. He later confessed to a total of 15 murders.

Early life
David-West reportedly had a tough childhood. Several individuals who knew him claimed that he was an only child born into a polygamous household, but he and his mother lived separately from the rest of the family. He claims that his mother was poisoned and that as the only son of his father much was expected of him but he could not deliver. He claimed that he attended the branch of the Lord's Chosen Church in Obigbo, where he said that he confessed to the pastor that he had been killing women. The pastor reportedly invited him to a crusade prayer service to heal him. 

David-West was reportedly a member of the Greenlanders (also known as Deebham, or Dey Gbam), a mafia-styled street gang that sprung out of the armed militant groups that are notorious in Nigeria for engaging in criminal acts of violence and Voodoo.

Murders
Although David-West reportedly belonged to a criminal group, David-West told authorities that he had acted alone.

Reason for murders
In a confession, David-West claimed that he had "an irresistible urge to kill" and every night from June to his capture in September he scoured the streets in his vehicle looking for women. He would proceed to take the victim to a local hotel where he and the victim would eat, have sex, and then go to bed. In the middle of the night David-West would wake up the victim and threaten her with a knife. Before killing the women he robbed them of money, ATM cards and other valuables. He would then turn the television or the radio on high volume, and using strips of cloth he had cut from the pillow cases, he would tie up the victim before manually strangling her. Victims were often found naked, bound with a white strip of cloth on their ankles, arms, and neck.

He was arrested when on the early morning of 19 September 2019, a woman who had accompanied him to a hotel woke up to David-West tying her up and preparing to suffocate her. David-West and another individual from Kaduna State were arrested and charged with homicide.

Trial
He was due for arraignment on 22 October 2019 but the absence of his lawyer frustrated his arraignment 
However, when the case was called up the following day, David-West pleaded guilty to nine murder charges against him but pleaded not guilty to the charge of attempted murder of the victim who survived his attack. Trial Judge, Justice Adolphus Enebeli adjourned till 18, 21, 27 and 29 November and 4 December 2019 for hearing and ordered that the suspect be remanded in prison custody.
On 23 March 2020 he shocked people in Court when he denied he was the person in any of the images on the front page of the newspaper and on a short CCTV video clip of him in a hotel with his alleged last victim, adding that he did not know what the prosecuting state council was talking about, since he had not committed any offense. The Judge allowed the video images to be admitted as evidence, did not accept the copy of the newspaper and adjourned the matter to 27 March 2020 for continuation  On 11 June 2020, the Judge gave 21 days to councils involved in the murder trial to file their written addresses and adjourned the suit to 29 July 2020 for adoption of written addresses.

In August 2020, the presiding judge of the Rivers State High Court sitting in Port Harcourt, Justice Adolphus Enebeli, fixed 9 October 2020 for the delivery of judgment on the murder charges leveled against David-West.

In October 2020 David-West was found guilty of murder and attempted murder and was sentenced to death by hanging by Justice Adolphus Enebeli.

See also
List of serial killers by country

References

1980s births
21st-century criminals
21st century in Port Harcourt
Living people
Male serial killers
People convicted of attempted murder
People from Buguma
People from Rivers State
Nigerian people convicted of murder
Nigerian prisoners sentenced to death
Nigerian serial killers
Violence against women in Nigeria